Phintella paludosa is a species of jumping spider in the genus Phintella that lives in Africa. It was first described in 2012 from a holotype discovered in Cross River State, Nigeria, by Wanda Wesołowska and G. B. Edwards, and was subsequently also found in Ivory Coast. The species was first seen in a swamp, so the species name is derived from the Latin for marshy. The spider is small, with a brown carapace and almost black abdomen. The female is smaller than the male. It is similar to the related Phintella aequipes but can be distinguished by the thick short embolus in the male of the species and the very small epigyne with copulatory openings at the rear in the female.

Taxonomy
Phintella paludosa was first identified in 2012 by Wanda Wesołowska and G. B. Edwards. It is one of over 500 species identified by Wesołowska. The species name is derived from the Latin word for marshy, and refers to the marshy ground where it was first discovered. The genus Phintella was raised in 1906 by Embrik Strand and W. Bösenberg. The genus name derives from the genus Phintia, which it resembles. The genus Phintia was itself renamed Phintodes, which was subsequently absorbed into Tylogonus. There are similarities between spiders within genus Phintella and those in Chira, Chrysilla, Euophrys, Icius, Jotus and Telamonia. Genetic analysis confirms that it is related to the genera Helvetia and Menemerus and is classified in the tribe Chrysillini.

Description
The spider was initially described based on a holotype specimen found by Jonathan Reid between 1978 and 1984. The species is similar to the related Phintella aequipes in size and colour, that is found throughout Africa, but differs in the structure of the copulatory organs. The spider is small, with a brown oval carapace covered in short hairs, a brown clypeus and very dark brown, nearly black, oval abdomen. The male is slightly larger than the female. The male has a thick short embolus while the female has a copulatory openings at the very rear of a very small epigyne.

Distribution and habitat
Phintella paludosa was first found in the Cross Rivers State in Nigeria, at the edge of a swamp. In 2022, when Wesołowska and Anthony Russell-Smith were undertaking an assessment of a large collection of spiders brought by Jean-Claude Ledoux from Ivory Coast to France between August 1974 and January 1976, they discovered another example that originated in the Lamto Scientific Reserve in Ivory Coast. It is now recognised as having a species distribution that includes both countries.

References

Citations

Bibliography

Fauna of Ivory Coast
Fauna of Nigeria
Spiders of Africa
Salticidae
Spiders described in 2012
Taxa named by Wanda Wesołowska